Antonio Ber Ciani (22 August 1907 in Santa Fe — 24 June 2001 in Buenos Aires) was an Argentine actor and film director. He is known for films such as Don Bildigerno de Pago Milagro.

Filmography

As director
 Donde comienzan los pantanos (1952)
 Martín Pescador (1951)
 Otra cosa es con guitarra (1949)
 Don Bildigerno de Pago Milagro (1948)
 El cantor del pueblo (1948)
 Lauracha (1946)
 La novia de los forasteros (1942)
 De la sierra al valle (1938)
 El forastero (1937)

As writer
 La novia de los forasteros (1942)
 De la sierra al valle (1938)

As direction assistant
 Ayúdame a vivir (1936)
 Besos brujos (1937)
 Muchachos de la ciudad (1937)

As actor
 El hombre del subsuelo (1981) 
 Fortín Alto (1941)
 Caprichosa y millonaria (1940)
 Muchachos de la ciudad (1937)
 La barra mendocina (1935)
 Muñequitas porteñas (1931)
 El cantar de mi ciudad (1930)
 Destinos (1929)
  (1929)

References

External links
 

1907 births
2001 deaths
People from Santa Fe, Argentina
Argentine film directors
Argentine film editors
Argentine male film actors